The Schleswig-Holsteinische Wörterbuch ("Schleswig-Holstein Dictionary") is a regional dictionary of the Low German language in the dialects used in the state of Schleswig-Holstein i.e.  Schleswig, Holsteinish and Hamburger Platt and their sub-dialects. The publisher and co-editor was the Germanist, Otto Mensing.

History 
With a newspaper appeal by Otto Mensing and his co-initiators in Schleswig-Holstein newspapers in 1902, in which the population of the state was asked to collect source material about Low German (Plattdeutsch) in Schleswig-Holstein and to send it to the initiators, preparatory work for the production of the Schleswig-Holstein Dictionary began. Mensing attached particular importance to working out the linguistic peculiarities in the individual regions of the country; at that time he headed the so-called Niederdeutsche Sozietät at the University of Kiel, was appointed professor there in 1917, but only in 1928 for his extensive research of the Plattdeutsch language freed from teaching.

By 1906 the first book with the title Schleswig-Holsteinisches Wörterbuch was published by C. Donath, which only contained instructions for gathering information. Between 1925 and 1935 the comprehensive People's Edition (Volksausgabe) of the Schleswig-Holsteinisches Wörterbuch in five volumes was published by Wachholtz Verlag. Among Mensing's employees were Gustav Friedrich Meyer and Peter Willers Jessen. In the years 1973 and 1985 the same publishers issued reprints.

Structure 
 Vol. 1 (1st–9th issue), 1927, letters A–E, 1074 columns
 Vol. 2 (10th–17th issue), 1929, letters F–J, 1070 columns
 Vol. 3 (18th–26th issue), 1931, letters K–P, 1172 columns
 Vol. 4 (27th–34th issue), 1933, letters Q–S, 1024 columns
 Vol. 5 (35th–40th issue), 1935, letters T–Z and addenda, 906 columns

Current edition 
 Otto Mensing: Schleswig-Holsteinisches Wörterbuch. Wachholtz Verlag, Neumünster, 1985 reprint, .

References and footnotes 

German dictionaries
Low German
Culture of Schleswig-Holstein